Zavat-e Sharq (also Romanized as Z̄avāt-e Sharq; also known as Zavāt and Zuvād) is a village in Kelarestaq-e Sharqi Rural District, in the Central District of Chalus County, Mazandaran Province, Iran. At the 2006 census, its population was 1,225, in 305 families.

References 

Populated places in Chalus County